is a Japanese female professional ten-pin bowler. She is a member of the Japan Professional Bowling Association, license no. 365. Although Nawa bowls right-handed, she writes and uses chopsticks left-handed. Nawa-pro was plagued with a right elbow injury between 2010 and 2012. She is managed by SUNNY SIDE UP.

Major accomplishments 
 2003 - Japan National Championships (4th place)
 2004 - Ladies vs. Rookies (winner)
 2005 - Eagle Classic (8th place)
 2006 - Japan National Championships (3rd place)
 2006 - Miyazaki Open Pro-Am (6th place)
 2006 - BIGBOX Higashi Yamato Cup (5th place)
 2006 - All Japan Mixed Doubles (7th place)
 2006 - 38th All Japan Championship (3rd place)
 2010 - ROUND1 Cup Ladies (10th place)
 2012 - Miyazaki Open Pro-Am (7th place)

P★League
 Tournament 2 - winner
 Tournament 3 - 2nd place
 Tournament 6 - 3rd place
 Tournament 9 - 3rd place
 Tournament 13 - 2nd place
 Tournament 31 - 3rd place
 Personal records: nine strikes in a row, high game 279

References

External links 
Profile @ P-League
Profile @ SUNNY SIDE UP

1979 births
Living people
Sportspeople from Tokyo
Japanese ten-pin bowling players